This is a list of equipment used by the Serbian Armed Forces.

Current equipment

Firearms

Protective gear

Armoured vehicles

Unarmoured vehicles

Artillery

Anti-armour

Aircraft

Air defence

Radars

River vessels

Modernization projects

References

Sources

External links

Serbian Army
Military equipment of Serbia
Serbian Armed Forces